Tustna is an island in Aure Municipality in Møre og Romsdal county, Norway. The  island lies in the western part of the municipality.  The island of Tustna lies west of the islands of Stabblandet and Solskjelsøya; to the northeast of the islands of Frei and Nordlandet; and south of the island of Smøla.  The Edøyfjorden runs along the northern shores of the island, the Vinjefjorden (and Halsafjorden) are to the south, the Freifjorden is to the southwest, the Talgsjøen is to the west, and the open Norwegian Sea is to the northwest.

The island of Tustna and surrounding islands was part of the municipality of Tustna from 1 January 1874 until 1 January 2006, when it was merged into Aure Municipality.  The main population centers on the island are Tømmervåg on the western coast, Leira on the northern coast, and Gullstein on the eastern coast.  The island is connected to the neighboring island of Stabblandet in the east by a bridge at the village of Tustna, and there is a ferry connection from Tømmervåg across the Talgsjø channel to the town of Kristiansund.  There is another ferry connection from the northern coast of Tustna to the island of Edøya in Smøla Municipality.

In 2015, the island had 822 residents living on it.

Name
The Old Norse form of the name in unknown (the name of the island is first mentioned on a Dutch map from 1623: "Toester"). It might be derived from the word  which means "staff" or "stick", and in that case it is probably referring to the form of one of the mountains on the island.  Historically, the island name was spelled "Tustern".

See also
List of islands of Norway

References

Islands of Møre og Romsdal
Aure, Norway